Backfire: A Transwave Best Of (1994-1996) is a Transwave album, released on January 12, 2007.

Track listing 
 "Adoration to the Aum" – 7:09
 "Hypersphere" – 7:00
 "Anahata" – 6:55
 "Arsonik" – 6:27
 "Cycles of Life" – 7:19
 "Code S9" – 6:39
 "Flamicogyre" – 9:46
 "Bombay Night" – 7:45
 "Ulysse Voyage No. 22" – 5:29

2007 albums